The Fowler River is a  river located in central New Hampshire in the United States. It is an inflow to Newfound Lake, part of the Pemigewasset and Merrimack River watersheds. Below Bog Brook, the Fowler River is subject to the New Hampshire Comprehensive Shoreland Protection Act.

The primary tributary of the river is Clark Brook, which rises south of Mount Cardigan in the town of Alexandria and drops over Welton Falls. Chesley Brook joins from the north, at which point the stream valley widens and begins to support small agricultural operations. The brook's name changes to "Fowler River" when Brock Brook joins from the right at the first crossing of Fowler River Road. The river flows southeast to a junction with Bog Brook, where it turns north and flows one mile to Newfound Lake.

See also

List of rivers of New Hampshire

References

Tributaries of the Merrimack River
Rivers of New Hampshire
Rivers of Grafton County, New Hampshire